Pternopetalum is a genus of flowering plants belonging to the family Apiaceae.

Its native range is Himalaya to Korea and Northern Indo-China.

Species:

Pternopetalum arunachalense 
Pternopetalum bipinnatum 
Pternopetalum botrychioides 
Pternopetalum caespitosum 
Pternopetalum cuneifolium 
Pternopetalum davidi 
Pternopetalum delavayi 
Pternopetalum gracillimum 
Pternopetalum latipinnulatum 
Pternopetalum leptophyllum 
Pternopetalum molle 
Pternopetalum monophyllum 
Pternopetalum nudicaule 
Pternopetalum porphyronotum 
Pternopetalum rosthornii 
Pternopetalum senii 
Pternopetalum subalpinum 
Pternopetalum tanakae 
Pternopetalum trichomanifolium 
Pternopetalum vulgare

References

Apioideae
Apioideae genera